Razar is a tehsil of Khyber Pakhtunkhwa, Pakistan.

Razar may also refer to:

Razar (DC Comics) known as 'The Changeling', fictional enemy of The Flash in DC Comics
Razar (Teenage Mutant Ninja Turtles), fictional character in Teenage Mutant Ninja Turtles
Razar (Legends of Chima), fictional character in Legends of Chima
Razar (Australian band), punk band from Brisbane, Australia, active from 1977 to 1979 (see Brisbane punk rock)
Razar (English band), late 1970s London punk band including Grant Stevens

See also
Razor (disambiguation)
 Razer (disambiguation)
 Rasor (disambiguation)
 Rezar, wrestler